This Green Hell is a 1936 British comedy film directed by Randall Faye and starring Edward Rigby, Sybil Grove and Richard Dolman. It was made at Nettlefold Studios in Walton-on-Thames as a quota quickie for release by the American company RKO.

Cast
 Edward Rigby as Dan Foyle  
 Sybil Grove as Mrs. Foyle  
 Richard Dolman as Andy  
 Roxie Russell as Peggy Foyle  
 John Singer as Billy Foyle  
 Billy Watts as Barton  
 Norman Pierce as Willington

References

Bibliography
 Low, Rachael. Filmmaking in 1930s Britain. George Allen & Unwin, 1985.
 Wood, Linda. British Films, 1927-1939. British Film Institute, 1986.

External links

1936 films
British comedy films
1936 comedy films
Films shot at Nettlefold Studios
Films directed by Randall Faye
Quota quickies
British black-and-white films
1930s English-language films
1930s British films